Daria Sergeyevna Skrypnik  (born 4 October 2000) is a Russian artistic gymnast. She resides in Krasnodar, Russia, and is coached by Marina Pletinetskaya. She is the 2014 Junior European uneven bars and team champion. She is also the 2015 Russian Junior National Champion.

Junior career

2014
At the 2014 European Championships, Skrypnik won a gold medal with her team and a gold on uneven bars.

2015
Skrypnik competed at the Junior Russian Championships in April 2015. She placed 7th with her team, as well as winning a gold medal in the all-around, a gold on the uneven bars, placing 8th on the balance beam, and collecting a bronze on the floor.

2016
Skrypnik turned senior in 2016. She placed 1st on bars in the Varna World Cup in May.

Competitive history

References

External links 
Russian Gymnastics profile

2000 births
Living people
Junior artistic gymnasts
Russian female artistic gymnasts
21st-century Russian women